Yolande Grisé (born 1944) is a Canadian history professor at the University of Ottawa and writer who served as the President of the Royal Society of Canada from 2011 to 2013. In 1982, she wrote the book Le suicide dans la Rome antique. In 2015, she was awarded the a membership into the Order of Canada for her efforts and contributions to the promotion of French language and culture in Canada, and to the advancement of knowledge and research as president of the Royal Society of Canada.

Publications 
Le suicide dans la Rome antique (1982)

Honors

References 

1944 births
Living people
20th-century Canadian historians
Canadian women historians
Canadian non-fiction writers in French
Members of the Order of Canada
Fellows of the Royal Society of Canada